José Luís Mendes Lopes (born 23 September 1992), known as Zezinho, is a Bissau-Guinean professional footballer who plays as a midfielder for Cypriot club Omonia Aradippou and the Guinea-Bissau national team.

Club career
Born in Bissau, Zezinho finished his development with Sporting CP after joining its youth system at the age of 16. He made his debut as a senior in the 2011–12 season, being loaned to Atlético Clube de Portugal and helping them to the ninth position in the Segunda Liga.

Subsequently, returned to the Estádio José Alvalade, Zezinho appeared almost exclusively with the B team during his tenure. His maiden Primeira Liga appearance occurred on 13 January 2013, as he came on as a 75th-minute substitute for Zakaria Labyad in a 2–0 away win against S.C. Olhanense. 

Zezinho served a further two loans before being released in June 2016, at Veria F.C. from the Super League Greece and Cypriot First Division club AEL Limassol.

International career
Zezinho earned his first cap for Guinea-Bissau on 4 September 2010 – 19 days before his 18th birthday – in a 1–0 home victory over Kenya for the 2012 Africa Cup of Nations qualifiers. Selected to the 2017 edition of the tournament by manager Baciro Candé, he featured in three games in an eventual group stage exit.

Zezinho was also included in the 2019 Africa Cup of Nations squad.

International goals
 (Guinea-Bissau score listed first, score column indicates score after each Zezinho goal)

References

External links

1992 births
Living people
Sportspeople from Bissau
Bissau-Guinean footballers
Association football midfielders
Primeira Liga players
Liga Portugal 2 players
Sporting CP B players
Sporting CP footballers
Atlético Clube de Portugal players
Super League Greece players
Veria F.C. players
Levadiakos F.C. players
Cypriot First Division players
Cypriot Second Division players
AEL Limassol players
Omonia Aradippou players
Slovak Super Liga players
FK Senica players
Saudi Professional League players
Damac FC players
Marsaxlokk F.C. players
Guinea-Bissau international footballers
2017 Africa Cup of Nations players
2019 Africa Cup of Nations players
Bissau-Guinean expatriate footballers
Expatriate footballers in Portugal
Expatriate footballers in Greece
Expatriate footballers in Cyprus
Expatriate footballers in Slovakia
Expatriate footballers in Saudi Arabia
Expatriate footballers in Malta
Bissau-Guinean expatriate sportspeople in Portugal
Bissau-Guinean expatriate sportspeople in Greece
Bissau-Guinean expatriate sportspeople in Cyprus
Bissau-Guinean expatriate sportspeople in Slovakia
Bissau-Guinean expatriate sportspeople in Saudi Arabia